Radical 38 or radical woman meaning "woman" or "female" is one of the 31 Kangxi radicals (214 radicals total) composed of three strokes.

In the Kangxi Dictionary, there are 681 characters (out of 49,030) to be found under this radical.

 is also the 56th indexing component in the Table of Indexing Chinese Character Components predominantly adopted by Simplified Chinese dictionaries published in mainland China.

Evolution

Derived characters

Controversies over sexism

Some feminists have claimed that many Chinese characters under radical woman are pejorative,  (slave),  (demon),  (JP: , envy),  (Simp.: , rape, traitor),  (dislike) for example, and learning and using them may unconsciously lead to misogyny. Some have even proposed a reform of these characters.

In 2010, a mainland Chinese male lawyer posted an essay online, in which he criticized 16 Chinese characters for their sexist implication. He also proposed a reform of some characters, e.g. replace  with a newly created Chinese character "" (: dog, usually associated with monsters or uncivilized actions. : behaviors. The proposed character therefore implies rape is a monstrous behavior.), believing that the change would reduce rape cases. Opponents argued that the new characters were historically unsound; that even if they were adopted, they would remain specious and would not effectively improve female's social status. They also pointed out that improvements in legal and social culture aspects were the actual remedy of sexism.

In 2015, an exhibition in Beijing entitled "姦: Cultural Codes of Gender Violence" organized by 65 artists was canceled by the authority. Still, the idea of this exhibition made its way through international media outlets. Tong Yujie, the exhibition's academic convener, questioned in her writing: "Why did one woman become three, and such a symbol of political and moral imagination and an object of enmity in traditional Chinese society and political theory?"

A 2014 study done by Wang Yuping from Anhui University's School of Chinese Language and Literature analyzed all Chinese characters under radical woman in a concise edition of Hanyu Da Cidian. The result shows that among these characters, there are 56 with negative meaning, 70 with positive meaning, and 184 are neutral. Nonetheless, the author believed that some of these categories suggested discrimination in traditional Chinese culture.

Similar controversies also exist in "gendered" European languages which have divisions between masculine and feminine terms. This phenomenon is called linguistic sexism.

Literature

References

External links

Unihan Database - U+5973

038
056
Terms for women